In the theory of formal languages, Ogden's lemma (named after William F. Ogden) is a generalization of the pumping lemma for context-free languages.

Statement 

We will use underlines to indicate "marked" positions.

Special cases 
Ogden's lemma is often stated in the following form, which can be obtained by "forgetting about" the grammar, and concentrating on the language itself:

 has at least one marked position,
 has at most  marked positions, and
 for all .

In the special case where every position is marked, Ogden's lemma is equivalent to the pumping lemma for context-free languages. Ogden's lemma can be used to show that certain languages are not context-free in cases where the pumping lemma is not sufficient. An example is the language .

Example applications

Non-context-freeness 
The special case of Ogden's lemma is often sufficient to prove some languages are not context-free. For example,  is a standard example of non-context-free language (p. 128).

Inherent ambiguity 
Ogden's lemma can be used to prove the inherent ambiguity of some languages, which is implied by the title of Ogden's paper.

Example: Let . The language  is inherently ambiguous. (Example from page 3 of Ogden's paper.)

Similarly,  is inherently ambiguous, and for any CFG of the language, letting  be the constant for Ogden's lemma, we find that  has at least  different parses. Thus  has an unbounded degree of inherent ambiguity.

Undecidability 
The proof can be extended to show that deciding whether a CFG is inherently ambiguous is undecidable, by reduction to the Post correspondence problem. It can also show that deciding whether a CFG has an unbounded degree of inherent ambiguity is undecidable. (page 4 of Ogden's paper)

Generalized condition 

Their dependence of the parameters was later improved by Dömösi and Kudlek. The statement becomes that every  can be written as

 has at least one marked position and no excluded position,
 has at most  marked positions, and
 for all .

Moreover, either each of  has a marked position, or each of  has a marked position.

References 

Formal languages
Lemmas